Čuma or kuga is the personification of plague in Serbian mythology. It was imagined as an old (rarely, as young) woman dressed in white. Mentioning čuma was avoided, so euphemisms kuma (godmother) or teta (aunty) were used.

Čumas were believed to live in a far away land, from where they set out to infect people. They hate dirtiness and are especially eager to infect a dirty house, hence if plague would appear in the vicinity, it was believed that every house and its occupants must be thoroughly cleaned; which was a useful belief that actually helps with real plague. Offerings of food, clean water, basil and a comb could also be made to her.

See also 
 Pestilence

References 

Slavic legendary creatures
Serbian folklore
Personifications
Legendary Serbian people